Vasili Ivanovich Grytsan (born 10 August 1967) is a former Russian professional footballer.

Club career
He made his professional debut in the Soviet Second League in 1985 for FC Podillya Khmelnytskyi.

References

1967 births
Living people
Soviet footballers
Russian footballers
Association football defenders
FC Podillya Khmelnytskyi players
FC Okean Nakhodka players
Russian Premier League players